Huacllan District is one of 5 districts in the Aija Province, of the Ancash Region in Peru. Its population was 364 as of the 2017 census.

History
Simultaneously with the creation of the Province of Aija, by Law N°8188, Huacllan was elevated to the category of District. The degree of obtained advance and the progressive eagerness of its population, justified this promotion. Previously it had been an annex of the Succha District.

Capital
The district's capital is the town of Huacllán, located on the slopes of the Condorkaka at an elevation of 3.083 m. Its more important locality is San Isidro.

References

Districts of the Aija Province
Districts of the Ancash Region